The men's 400 metres hurdles event at the 1936 Summer Olympic Games took place on August 3 and August 4. There were 32 competitors from 20 nations. The maximum number of athletes per nation had been set at 3 since the 1930 Olympic Congress. The final was won by American Glenn Hardin. After two Games of silver and bronze medals, it was the United States' first victory since 1920 and sixth overall. However, it was the first time since 1900 that the Americans had only one medalist in the event. John Loaring took Canada's first 400 metres hurdles medal since 1900 with his silver. Miguel White gave the Philippines a bronze in its 400 metres hurdles debut.

Background

This was the eighth time the event was held. It had been introduced along with the men's 200 metres hurdles in 1900, with the 200 being dropped after 1904 and the 400 being held through 1908 before being left off the 1912 programme. However, when the Olympics returned in 1920 after World War I, the men's 400 metres hurdles was back and would continue to be contested at every Games thereafter.

Three of the six finalists from the 1932 Games returned: silver medalist Glenn Hardin of the United States, fifth-place finisher Luigi Facelli of Italy, and sixth-place finisher Kell Areskoug of Sweden. Hardin held the Olympic record, as the 1932 winner (Bob Tisdall) had knocked over a hurdle, as well as the world record which he had dropped from 52.0 seconds to 51.8 and then to 50.6 seconds in 1934. Hardin had not lost a 400 metres hurdles race since being beaten by Tisdall in that Los Angeles 1932 final.

Austria, the Philippines, and Yugoslavia each made their debut in the event. The United States made its eighth appearance, the only nation to have competed at every edition of the event to that point.

Competition format

The competition featured the three-round format introduced in 1908: quarterfinals, semifinals, and a final. Ten sets of hurdles were set on the course. The hurdles were 3 feet (91.5 centimetres) tall and were placed 35 metres apart beginning 45 metres from the starting line, resulting in a 40 metres home stretch after the last hurdle. The 400 metres track was standard.

There were 6 quarterfinal heats, with between 4 and 6 athletes each. The top 2 men in each quarterfinal advanced to the semifinals. The 12 semifinalists were divided into 2 semifinals of 6 athletes each, with the top 3 in each semifinal advancing to the 6-man final.

Records

These were the standing world and Olympic records (in seconds) prior to the 1936 Summer Olympics.

No new world or Olympic records were set during the competition.

Schedule

The semifinals were held on the day of the final instead of the day of the quarterfinals.

Results

The fastest two runners in each of the six heats advanced to the semifinal round.

Quarterfinals

Quarterfinal 1

Quarterfinal 2

Quarterfinal 3

Quarterfinal 4

Quarterfinal 5

Quarterfinal 6

Semifinals

The fastest three runners in each of the two heats advanced to the final round.

Semifinal 1

Semifinal 2

Final

Results summary

References

Athletics at the 1936 Summer Olympics
400 metres hurdles at the Olympics
Men's events at the 1936 Summer Olympics